The Honoris Crux (Cross of Honour) of 1975, post-nominal letters HC, is a military decoration for bravery which was instituted by the Republic of South Africa on 1 July 1975. The decoration was awarded to members of the South African Defence Force for bravery in dangerous circumstances. It was the junior in a set of four Honoris Crux decorations in four classes, which together replaced the discontinued Honoris Crux of 1952.

The South African military
The Union Defence Forces (UDF) were established in 1912 and renamed the South African Defence Force (SADF) in 1958. On 27 April 1994, it was integrated with six other independent forces into the South African National Defence Force (SANDF).

Institution
The Honoris Crux (Cross of Honour) of 1975, post-nominal letters HC, was instituted by the State President on 1 July 1975.

Award criteria
The decoration was awarded for bravery in dangerous circumstances. It was the junior of four classes of Honoris Crux decorations, the Honoris Crux Diamond, Honoris Crux Gold, Honoris Crux Silver and Honoris Crux, which together replaced the discontinued Honoris Crux of 1952.

Altogether 201 Honoris Crux decorations were awarded between 1976 and 2004. Most of the awards were won in action, but some were awarded for bravery in non-combat situations. After the institution of the Army Cross, Air Force Cross, Navy Cross and Medical Service Cross in 1987, the award criteria were amended in 1993 to restrict awarding of the Honoris Crux to deeds of bravery in action, while in mortal danger facing the enemy.

The South African military units which were awarded the most Honoris Crux decorations are the Special Forces of the South African Reconnaissance Commandos, whose operators were awarded a total of forty-six Honoris Crux Decorations during the 1966-1989 Border War, in three of the four classes.

Order of wear

The position of the Honoris Crux of 1975 in the official order of precedence was revised twice after 1975, to accommodate the inclusion or institution of new decorations and medals, upon the integration into the South African National Defence Force in 1994 and again upon the institution of a new set of awards in 2003.

South African Defence Force until 26 April 1994
  
Official SADF order of precedence:
 Preceded by the Van Riebeeck Decoration (DVR).
 Succeeded by the Pro Virtute Decoration (PVD).
Official national order of precedence:
 Preceded by the King's/Queen's Police Medal for Gallantry or Distinguished Service (KPM/QPM).
 Succeeded by the Correctional Services Cross for Valour, Ruby (CPF).

South African National Defence Force from 27 April 1994
  
Official SANDF order of precedence:
 Preceded by the Van Riebeeck Decoration (DVR) of the Republic of South Africa.
 Succeeded by the Gallantry Cross, Silver of the Republic of Venda.
Official national order of precedence:
 Preceded by the King's/Queen's Police Medal for Gallantry or Distinguished Service (KPM/QPM) of the United Kingdom.
 Succeeded by the Correctional Services Cross for Valour, Ruby (CPF) of the Republic of South Africa.

The position of the Honoris Crux of 1975 in the order of precedence remained unchanged, as it was on 27 April 1994, when a new series of military orders, decorations and medals was instituted on 27 April 2003.

Description
Obverse
The Honoris Crux of 1975 is a silver Maltese cross, which fits in a 45 millimetres diameter circle, with two swords in saltire surmounted by a circular protea wreath, the arms of the cross in white enamel, with a roundel in the centre, tierced horizontally in the orange, white and blue bands of the national flag, framed in a double silver circle containing 24 stones.

Reverse
The reverse has the pre-1994 South African Coat of Arms, with the decoration number impressed underneath.

Ribbon
The ribbon is 32 millimetres wide, with a 2½ millimetres wide white band, a 3 millimetres wide orange band and a 1 millimetre wide white band, repeated in reverse order and separated by a 19 millimetres wide orange band.

Discontinuation
Conferment of the decoration was discontinued in respect of services performed on or after 27 April 2003, when the Honoris Crux of 1975 was replaced by the new Nkwe ya Selefera (NS).

Recipients

Note 1: denotes a posthumous award.
Note 2: ♦ denotes a non-combat or non-operational act of bravery.
Note 3: ♥ André Diedericks was also awarded the HCS in 1985.
Note 4: ♥ Sterzel, Stuart was the last recipient of the Honoris Crux Series in 2004.

Actions cited for

References

Military decorations and medals of South Africa
Courage awards
1975 establishments in South Africa
Awards established in 1975